Duke Mathematical Journal is a peer-reviewed mathematics journal published by Duke University Press. It was established in 1935. The founding editors-in-chief were David Widder, Arthur Coble, and Joseph Miller Thomas. The first issue included a paper by Solomon Lefschetz. Leonard Carlitz served on the editorial board for 35 years, from 1938 to 1973.

The current managing editor is Richard Hain (Duke University).

Impact
According to the journal homepage, the journal has a 2018 impact factor of 2.194, ranking it in the top ten mathematics journals in the world.

References

External links
 

Mathematics journals
Mathematical Journal
Publications established in 1935
Multilingual journals
English-language journals
French-language journals
Duke University Press academic journals